These are statistics for the 2019 FIFA Women's World Cup, which took place in France from 7 June to 7 July 2019. The World Cup started with 6 groups, there were 4 national teams in each group, it is a round-robin tournament in group stage and the top two to three teams qualify. It then goes to an elimination tournament among the 16 qualified teams. Goals, assist, performance analyses, and squad performance are shown here. Goals scored from penalty shoot-outs are not counted, and matches decided by penalty shoot-outs are counted as draws.

Goalscorers

Assists

Scoring

Overall

Timing
 First goal of the tournament: Eugénie Le Sommer for France against South Korea
 First brace of the tournament: Wendie Renard for France against South Korea
 First hat-trick of the tournament: Cristiane for Brazil against Jamaica
 Last goal of the tournament: Rose Lavelle for United States against Netherlands
 Last brace of the tournament: Megan Rapinoe for United States against France
 Last hat-trick of the tournament: Cristiana Girelli for Italy against Jamaica
 Fastest goal in a match from kickoff: 3rd minute
Jill Scott for England against Norway
 Fastest goal in a match after coming on as a substitute: 
Latest goal in a match without extra time: 90+6th minute
Elin Rubensson for Sweden against Thailand
 Latest goal in a match with extra time: 107th minute
Amandine Henry for France against Brazil
 Latest winning goal in a match without extra time: 95th minute
Ajara Nchout for Senegal against New Zealand
 Latest winning goal in a match with extra time: 107th minute
Amandine Henry for France against Brazil
 Shortest time difference between two goals scored by the same team in a match: 1 minute
Alex Morgan and Sam Mewis for United States against Thailand

Teams
 Most goals scored by a team: 26
United States
 Fewest goals scored by a team: 1
China, Jamaica, New Zealand, South Africa, South Korea, Thailand
 Most goals conceded by a team: 20
Thailand
 Fewest goals conceded by a team: 2
Germany
 Best goal difference: +23
United States
 Worst goal difference: –19
Thailand
 Most goals scored in a match by both teams: 13
United States 13–0 Thailand
 Most goals scored in a match by one team: 13
United States against Thailand
Most goals scored in a match by the losing team: 2
Brazil against Australia
Biggest margin of victory: 13 goals
United States 13–0 Thailand
 Most clean sheets achieved by a team: 4
Germany and United States
Fewest clean sheets achieved by a team: 0
Australia, Cameroon, Jamaica, New Zealand, Scotland, South Africa, South Korea, Thailand
Most clean sheets given by an opposing team: 3
China
Fewest clean sheets given by an opposing team: 0
Australia, Brazil, England, France, Germany, Scotland, United States
Most consecutive clean sheets achieved by a team: 4
Germany
Most consecutive clean sheets given by an opposing team: 2
Argentina, China, Jamaica, New Zealand, Nigeria, South Africa, South Korea, Spain

Individual

Most goals scored by one player in a match: 5
Alex Morgan for United States against Thailand

Wins and losses
 Most wins: 7 – United States
 Fewest wins: 0 – Argentina, Jamaica, New Zealand, Scotland, South Africa, South Korea, Thailand
 Most losses: 3 – Cameroon, Jamaica, New Zealand, Nigeria, South Africa, South Korea, Thailand
 Fewest losses: 0 – United States
 Most draws: 2 – Argentina
 Fewest draws: 0 – Brazil, Cameroon, Canada, Chile, England, France, Germany, Italy, Jamaica, Netherlands, New Zealand, Nigeria, South Africa, South Korea, Sweden, Thailand, United States

Match awards

Player of the Match

Clean sheets

Squads

Discipline
A player was automatically suspended for the next match for the following offences:
 Receiving a red card (red card suspensions may be extended for serious offences)
 Receiving two yellow cards in two matches; yellow cards expire after the completion of the quarter-finals (yellow card suspensions are not carried forward to any other future international matches)

The following suspensions were served during the tournament:

Multiple World Cups
Scoring at three or more World Cups

Appearing at four or more World Cups

Overall results
Bold numbers indicate the maximum values in each column.

By team

By confederation

References

statistics